KEMB-LP (94.1 FM) is a radio station licensed to serve Emmetsburg, Iowa.  The station is owned by the Emmetsburg Chamber of Commerce. It airs a community radio format.

The station was assigned the KEMB-LP call letters by the Federal Communications Commission on January 5, 2004.

In November 2005, the KEMB-LP broadcast studio was dedicated to the memory of veteran broadcaster Dane Roach. He had been instrumental in creating the radio station for the Chamber of Commerce, designing the system and setting up the technical requirements.

See also
List of community radio stations in the United States

References

External links
KEMB-LP official website
KEMB-LP blog 
 
KEMB-LP service area per the FCC database

EMB-LP
Community radio stations in the United States
EMB-LP
Radio stations established in 2004
Palo Alto County, Iowa